Fredrick is a 2016 psychological action thriller written by Rajesh Butalia, directed by Rajesh Butalia and produced by Manish Kalaria. The film stars Prashant Narayanan, Tulna and Avinash Dhyani in the lead roles. The film released worldwide on 27 May 2016.

Plot 

A 16-year-old boy has a strong bond with another boy. His father not only opposes this, he has attacked the other boy. The story takes a surprising and unimaginable turn when Vikram realizes that whatever clues they find during their search are all linked with Fredrick; every second they find something shocking. They wonder who Fredrick is and where he is. If Fredrick wanted to have him killed, he could have done so easily. They wonder why he hasn't.

All the puzzles and mysteries are running parallel and when Vikram learns that Fredrick is not trying to kill him, he becomes even more confused. One day he finally comes face to face with Fredrick, who himself has come forth as a larger unimaginable riddle. Amidst all these mysteries and revelations this interesting tale finally reaches a painful end.

Reception
Fredrick has received mixed responses from various film critics. HindustaNews rated the film 4/5 and wrote "Fredrick is a good film and the direction of the film is also excellent. Shootings of this film have been done in beautiful places. But film shooting techniques can be little bit improvised." FilmyTown rated the film 3/5, and wrote "To a certain extent, this story keeps one on the edge and intrigued right from the first frame. It has a decent pace except towards the climax where it could have been crisper." The Times of India rated the film 1.5/5. NowRunning rated the film 1/5. But Avinash Dhyani received a very positive response for his acting. Soon he is coming in Rifleman Jaswant Singh Rawat.

Cast 
 Prashant Narayanan
 Tulna
 Avinash Dhyani

Production 
This film was produced by Evana Entertainment, who holds exclusive rights for the music distribution.

Music

The music for Fredrick was composed by Sunjoy Bose, with lyrics written by Rajesh Butalia.

References

External links

2016 films
Indian psychological thriller films
2010s Hindi-language films
2016 thriller films
Hindi-language thriller films